Mahbubnagar railway station (station code: MBNR) is an Indian Railways station in Mahabubnagar of Telangana. It lies on the Secunderabad–Dhone section and is administered under Hyderabad railway division of South Central Railway zone.

Structure and amenities 
The station has rooftop solar panels installed by the Indian railways, along with various railway stations and service buildings in the country, as a part of sourcing 500 MW solar energy.

References

External links 

Railway stations in Mahabubnagar district